Largo Winch is a Belgian comic book series by Philippe Francq and Jean Van Hamme, published by Dupuis. It started as a series of novels by Van Hamme in the late 1970s, but stopped due to a lack of success and the huge amount of work Van Hamme had in the meantime with his comic books (e.g. Thorgal). When artist Philippe Francq wanted to start a series with Van Hamme, he revived his old hero, and reworked the novels into the first albums of the comic book series. Later, more stories followed.

Synopsis 
The main character is Largo Winch; birth name Largo Winczlav, who was born in Yugoslavia. Other important characters include Nerio Winch (his adoptive father, though they share a great-grandparent), senior Group W executives John D. Sullivan and Dwight E. Cochrane, and his friend Simon Ovronnaz. In the first two volumes of the series, L'héritier and Le Groupe W, Largo, a young and handsome orphan, is propelled to the head of a business empire, Group W (of no relation to the real-life broadcasting division of American conglomerate Westinghouse Electric Corporation), after his adoptive father Nerio is murdered, and goes through a lot of troubles to preserve his inheritance and avenge Nerio. The following albums are more or less based on the same basic plot: someone is trying to harm Largo's company or to take control of it from him, and he has to fight that someone to ensure the survival of his holdings. Almost every story arc involves corrupt authority figures of a type which Nerio easily manipulated, but Largo confronts from the viewpoint of an "everyman".

All the stories of the series are published in two volumes, the first one being the one putting Largo in an impossible situation, and the second one letting him get out of it. In addition, both volumes share the same background color on the cover. The stories appear originally in French, and have been translated into various languages, including Croatian, Danish, Dutch, English, German, Greek, Polish, Portuguese, Serbian, Spanish, Swedish, Italian and Tamil. The series is among the most popular comics series in French, with annual sales of nearly 500,000 copies.

History
The birth of the character came in 1973, while Van Hamme was having lunch in New York City with Greg, chief editor of Tintin. The magazine sought to expand to the American market and Van Hamme was tasked with creating the comic character and genre interesting for an American audience. He thus opted for a business-thriller idea about a young mysterious billionaire, which would allow him to demonstrate his knowledge of economics. John Prentice, noted for his work on Rip Kirby, was chosen as the artist, and he drew a couple of boards before withdrawing from the project that was soon abandoned. Van Hamme first revived the character in form of an airport novel in 1978, encouraged by the huge popularity of Gérard de Villiers' SAS novels. The series lasted through 1985 when it came to a halt again. Finally, in 1990, being approached by Francq, Van Hamme used the character yet again in comic form, and it had instant success.

Albums 

 L'Héritier
 Le Groupe W
 O.P.A.
 Business Blues
 H
 Dutch Connection
 La Forteresse De Makiling
 L'Heure du Tigre
 Voir Venise...
 ...Et mourir
 Golden Gate
 Shadow
 Le Prix de l'Argent
 La Loi du Dollar
 Les Trois Yeux des Gardiens du Tao
 La Voie et la Vertu
 Mer Noire
 Colère Rouge
 Chassé-Croisé
 20 Secondes
 L'Étoile du Matin
 Les Voiles Écarlates
 La Frontière de la Nuit

In English
The volumes have been translated into English and published by Cinebook in a censored form. The following volumes have been released to date:

 The Heir (includes The W Group)
 Takeover Bid (includes Business Blues)
 Dutch Connection (includes H)
 The Hour of the Tiger (includes Fort Makiling)
 See Venice...
 ...And Die
 Golden Gate
 Shadow
 The Price of Money
 The Law of the Dollar
 The Three Eyes Of The Tao Guardians
 The Way and the Virtue
 Cold Black Sea
 Red Hot Wrath
 Crossing Paths
 20 Seconds
 Morning Starr
 Scarlet Sail
 The Edge of Night

Spinoff- La Fortune des Winczlav
 Vanko, 1848
 Tom and Liza, 1910

In other media

TV

An English-language TV series loosely based on the comics was launched in 2001 and lasted two seasons, starring Paolo Seganti as Largo Winch and Diego Walraff as Simon Ovronnaz. It aired in France on M6 and in Canada on Showcase Television as Largo. The complete series is available on DVD in France, with the episodes however only in dubbed French.

Film

A film, written and directed by Jérôme Salle and starring Tomer Sisley as Largo Winch, was released in France on December 17, 2008, loosely adapting the first two issues with elements of the next two.

A sequel, also by Salle, was released in 2011. Not adapting a particular storyline, it drew inspiration from the events of the fifth and six issues to create a new story. A third film is in the works, based on issues 13 and 14, without the involvement of Salle and Sisley but with a screenplay by series creator Jean Van Hamme himself, who'd been critical of the past films, and of Salle in particular.

A documentary, "Largo", directed by Yves Legrain-Crist with Jean Van Hamme and Philippe Francq, was released in France in Autumn 2007. This film shows two authors are searching for the answer to the question:
"How is a comic book created?" It is available, with English subtitles, directly from the producers through VOD

Video game

Largo Winch: Empire Under Threat is an action-adventure game released in 2002 by Dupuis only in Europe. It is a puzzle-based third-person game with Largo himself as the playable character. The plot of the game follows the usual scenario of Largo Winch stories, with his business empire under threat as he fights to save it, in locations such as New York - Veracruz, Mexico - Russia, Siberia - Sardinia - and Nerio's Island Sarjevane in the Adriatic Sea. It received mixed reviews from critics

See also
Agnyaathavaasi

References

External links
 
 English publisher of Largo Winch - Cinebook Ltd
 Largo Winch 2 official fansite

Winch, Largo
Belgian comic strips
1990 comics debuts
Winch, Largo
Winch, Largo
Winch, Largo
Winch, Largo
Winch, Largo
2002 video games
Action comics
Adventure comics
Crime comics
Drama comics
Action-adventure games
Bandes dessinées
Comics based on novels
Belgian comics adapted into films
Comics adapted into television series
Comics adapted into video games
Europe-exclusive video games
GameCube games
Novels adapted into comics
PlayStation 2 games
Ubisoft games
Video games based on comics
Windows games
Xbox games
Comics by Jean Van Hamme
Fictional Montenegrin people
Fictional Serbian people